The common name dory (from the Middle English dorre, from the Middle French doree, lit. "gilded one") is shared (officially and colloquially) by members of several different families of large-eyed, silvery, deep-bodied, laterally compressed, and roughly discoid marine fish. As well as resembling each other, dories are also similar in habit: most are deep-sea and demersal. Additionally, many species support commercial fisheries as food fish. Most dory families belong to the order Zeiformes, suborder Zeioidei:

The "true dories", family Zeidae (five species, including the well-known John Dory)
The zeniontids, family Zenionidae or Zeniontidae (seven species)
The "Australian dories", family Cyttidae (three species all within the genus Cyttus)
The oreos, family Oreosomatidae (ten species)
The parazen family, Parazenidae (four species, including the rosy dory)

Additionally, several species of spinyfin (family Diretmidae, order Beryciformes) have been given the name dory by fishmongers.

In parts of Southeast Asia, fillets of Pangasius sp. catfishes are referred to as cream dory, Pangasius dory or Pacific dory.

See also 
List of fish common names
Dory (disambiguation)

Fish common names